Kavana is the debut studio album by British singer-songwriter Kavana. Kavana was discovered by Take That's manager Nigel Martin-Smith, and was subsequently signed to his label in early 1996. The album was recorded throughout 1996 and the beginning of 1997, being released the week following the album's fourth single, "MFEO". Kavana worked with many big name stars on the album, including Lulu ("Protected", who also provides backing vocals for the track) and Howard Donald ("Crazy Chance"). The album was released on 11 April 1997 to good critical reception, however only reached #29 on the UK Albums Chart. Subsequently, second pressing copies of the album have a "Reduced Price" logo printed on the booklet and were retailed shortly before the release of "Crazy Chance '97". However, again these failed to increase the album's chart position. Both "I Can Make You Feel Good" and "MFEO" became UK Top 10 hits, both peaking at #8 respectively.

Singles
 "Crazy Chance" was released as the lead single from the album. The track peaked at #35 on the UK Singles Chart. Additional tracks released alongside the single included; "Wait for the Day" (later released on the album), "Crazy Chance (instrumental version), "Wait for the Day" (instrumental version), "One More Chance" (later released as a Japanese bonus) and "Crazy Chance" (12" version).
 "Where Are You" was released as the second single from the album. The track peaked at #26 on the UK Singles Chart. Additional tracks on the single release include; "Where Are You" (7" radio version), "For the Very First Time" (instrumental version), "Crazy Chance" (brand new mix), "For the Very First Time" (full version), "Where Are You" (live version).
 "I Can Make You Feel Good" was released as the third single from the album. The track peaked at #8 on the UK Singles Chart. Additional tracks on the single release include; "Dangerous" (non-album track), "I Can Make You Feel Good" (7" version), "I Can Make You Feel Good" (the Rapino Brothers edit), "Crazy Chance" (12" mastermix), "I Can Make You Feel Good" (the Rapino Brothers 12"), "For the Very First Time" (extended disco mix), "Dangerous" (instrumental version).
 "MFEO" was released as the fourth single from the album. The track peaked at #8 on the UK Singles Chart. Additional tracks on the single release include; "MFEO" (Cutfather & Joe 7" version), "MFEO" (7" master version), "MFEO" (raw beats mix), "Work" (Harding and Curnow version), "MFEO" (Cutfather & Joe full version), "MFEO" (steppers mix), "MFEO" (Phil Chill mix).
 "Crazy Chance '97" was released as the last single from the album. The track peaked at #16 on the UK Singles Chart. Additional tracks on the single release include; "Listen for the Music" (non-album track), "Crazy Chance" ('97 version), "Crazy Chance" (T-empo's hard dub), "Crazy Chance" (T-empo's club mix), "Everything to Me" (non-album track).

Track listing

Charts

References

1997 debut albums
Kavana (singer) albums